The RagWing RW11 Rag-A-Bond is a two-seat, high wing, strut-braced, conventional landing gear, single engine homebuilt aircraft designed by Roger Mann and sold as plans by RagWing Aircraft Designs for amateur construction.

The RW11 is a replica of the Piper PA-15 Vagabond.

Design and development
The RW11 was designed for the US experimental homebuilt aircraft category or as a US FAR 103 Ultralight Vehicles two-seat ultralight trainer and first flown in 1996.

The airframe is constructed entirely from wood and covered with aircraft fabric. The landing gear is of conventional configuration with bungee suspension.

The RW11 is only offered as plans and the designer estimates it will take 500 hours to complete the aircraft.

Specifications (RW11)

References

External links

Homebuilt aircraft
High-wing aircraft
Aircraft first flown in 1996